Lossless predictive audio compression (LPAC) is an improved lossless audio compression algorithm developed by Tilman Liebchen, Marcus Purat and Peter Noll at Institute for Telecommunications, Technical University Berlin (TU Berlin), to compress PCM audio in a lossless manner, unlike conventional audio compression algorithms which are lossy.

Meanwhile, it is no longer developed because an advanced version of it has become an official standard under the name of MPEG-4 Audio Lossless Coding.

See also 
 Monkey's Audio (APE)
 Free Lossless Audio Codec (FLAC)
 Lossless Transform Audio Compression (LTAC)
 True Audio (TTA)

External links 
 Lossless Predictive Audio Compression (LPAC) 
 The basic principles of lossless audio data compression (TTA)  The Lossless Audio Blog Lossless Audio News & Information Site.

Lossless audio codecs